Private Charles D. Ennis (8 August 1843 – 29 December 1930) was an American soldier who fought in the American Civil War. Ennis received the country's highest award for bravery during combat, the Medal of Honor, for his action during the Third Battle of Petersburg in Virginia on 2 April 1865. He was honored with the award on 28 June 1892.

Biography
Ennis was born in Stonington, Connecticut on 8 August 1843. He enlisted into the 1st Rhode Island Light Artillery. He died on 29 December 1930 and his remains are interred at the White Brook Cemetery in Rhode Island.

Medal of Honor citation

See also

List of American Civil War Medal of Honor recipients: A–F

Notes

References

External links

NPS - Ennis, Charles D.
NPS - 1st Regiment, Rhode Island Light Artillery

1843 births
1930 deaths
People of Rhode Island in the American Civil War
Union Army officers
United States Army Medal of Honor recipients
American Civil War recipients of the Medal of Honor
Military personnel from Connecticut